The Embassy of the Free Mind is a museum, library and platform for free thinking, inspired by the philosophy of the Bibliotheca Philosophica Hermetica collection. The museum focusses on the European culture of free thinking of the past 2.000 years, with Hermetic wisdom as the source of inspiration: insight into the connection between God, cosmos and man. This connection is reflected in the Hermetic, alchemical, astrological, magical, mystical, kabbalistic and Rosicrucian texts and images in the collection.

History
The Embassy of the Free Mind was opened in October 2017 by the author Dan Brown. The roots of the museum lie in the Bibliotheca Philosophica Hermetica (Ritman Library). This scientific research library, with a collection of 25.000 books and an own publisher dates back from 1958 when Amsterdam based businessman Joost Ritman started it as a private library. In 1984 the library got open for general public and moved within Amsterdam to the Bloemstraat. Ritman brought together manuscripts and printed books in the area of the hermetic tradition, took care of the coherence of the diverse collection and showed their importance and relevancy for the world today. Since the opening the library focussed on activities like expanding the collection, the development of expertise within the Ritman research institute and the growth of its own publisher In de Pelikaan. In 2009 the library obtained the status of Public Benefit Organisation (PBO).
By moving to the House of the Heads in 2017 and obtaining the status of museum, resulting in the Embassy of the Free Mind, the organisation takes a new step in making the collection more accessible for a wider audience.

Building
The Embassy of the Free Mind is located in the 17th century Amsterdam building the Huis met de Hoofden on the Keizersgracht 123. The canal house was built in 1622 by Hendrick de Keyser and is listed as one of the 'Top 100 buildings of the Dutch Rijksdienst'. Six heads adorn the façade. They depict the Roman gods Apollo, Ceres, Mercury, Minerva, Bacchus and Diana. God of commerce Mercury and goddess of wisdom Minerva were placed left and right of the central entrance in the 17th century to make it clear that this was the home of a wise merchant (Mercator Sapiens).
Lodewijk and Laurens de Geer, from 1634 residents of the House with the Heads for 150 years, were besides affluent entrepreneurs also patrons of free thinkers and made the printing of their works possible. Their home library of approximately 6,000 books shows similarities with the books that are now once again in the museum library.

Collection
The Museum has a collection of more than 25.000 books on Hermetica, Rosicrucianism, alchemy, mysticism, gnosis, Western esotericism and religious studies. Other collection areas within the library cover sufism, kabbalah, anthroposophy, theosophy, pansophy, freemasonry and grail. The library owns c. 4500 manuscripts and printed books before 1900 and more than 20.000 books (primary and secondary sources) printed after 1900. In the collection of the Bibliotheca Philosophica Hermetica are located: Corpus Hermeticum, published in 1503 and printed on parchment, Robert Fludd’s Utriusque cosmi historia, published in 1617. Moreover, the museum possesses Atalanta Fugiens written by Michael Maier, Biblia Polyglotta written by Christoffel Plantijn and a widespread collection of works by Gustav Meyrink.

References 

Museums in Amsterdam
2017 establishments in the Netherlands
Libraries in Amsterdam
21st-century architecture in the Netherlands